Bosch Smart Manufacturing Conclave (BSM) is an annual event and an invite only conference aimed to bring Industry 4.0 leaders and smart manufacturing practitioners from India and Europe. The first event was held in Mumbai on November 5, 2015 with over 300 attendees (Elite industry leaders) and an additional 50,000 people were expected to follow this event online.

In 2015, BSM was inaugurated by Mr. Amitabh Kant (Secretary, Department of Industrial Policy and Promotion, Ministry of Commerce and Industry) and the program included keynotes from Stefan Aßmann (Senior Vice President, Connected Industry, Robert Bosch GmbH) and Alexander Verl (Chairman of the Board, Fraunhofer Future Foundation, Fraunhofer-Gesellschaft).

References

Bosch to host Smart Manufacturing Conclave in Mumbai

External links
 Bosch Smart Manufacturing Conclave

Trade associations based in the United Kingdom
International conferences